Ross Paule (born April 4, 1976) is an American former soccer midfielder, who last played for the Columbus Crew of Major League Soccer.

Paule moved from Dallas, TX as a youth and joined the Memphis Futbol Club in Memphis, Tennessee.  Paule also starred for Houston High School in Germantown, Tennessee where he was awarded the Commercial Appeal's Best of the Preps title.

Paule played college soccer at Creighton University, but left only after three seasons, becoming one of the first players to leave college early for a jump to MLS. He was drafted 11th overall by the Colorado Rapids in the 1997 MLS College Draft, and became a regular right away, a starter by his second season, appearing in 19 games and starting seven. Paule's best year with the Rapids came in 1998, when he tallied ten goals and six assists. He stayed with the team through 2001, running the team's midfield, and was atop the league's assist charts at midseason, when the Rapids traded for midfield maestro Carlos Valderrama. With no place for Paule on the squad, he was dealt to the MetroStars for Steve Shak and a draft pick.

Paule spent the rest of 2001 and all of 2002 with the Metros, usually playing—in a new out-of-position role of defensive midfielder, as mandated by Metro coach Octavio Zambrano. Ross was traded to Columbus prior to the 2003 season for Chris Leitch and Jeff Matteo and spent the next two seasons there, scoring seven goals in 2004, including a hat-trick against Los Angeles Galaxy. In eight years in MLS, his totals are 31 goals and 41 assists.

Paule retired early into the 2005 season because of post-concussion syndrome. He then went on to coach a local club, WASA, for the u12A girls team. After his first season with them he moved back to Memphis and is now the executive director of the Fellowship of Christian Athletes Soccer where he is producing a Soccer Themed New Testament with high-profile professional soccer player testimonies inserted into the New Testament.  Each testimony is unique as Paule is connecting the players character trait to a person of faith throughout the Bible.  He also is the executive director of newly formed Arlington Soccer Academy in TN.

Career highlights
Ross Paule was inducted into the Creighton University Athletic Hall of Fame in 2011.

United States National Team
 U17 US National Team (1991–92)
 U20 US National Team (1993–95)
 US Men's Full National Team Pool Player (1998-2001)

Major League Soccer (MLS)
 Played in MLS Cup Championship as a rookie vs. DC United – 1997
 Top three Rookie of the Year – 1997 
 MLS Player of the Month – 1998
 MVP for Colorado Rapids – 1998
 MLS All Star Team – 1998 and 1999
 MVP for Columbus Crew – 2003
 Top three MLS Goal of the Year – 2004

Coaching
Ross has continued with his interest in soccer, serving as a coach and mentor to others, focusing on using his professional experience to develop youth soccer in the US. Ross has been involved in coaching youth soccer at the US National level through the Adidas ESP Program, where he is a Staff Coach since 2006. Adidas ESP is one of the Nation's Top Events for the elite US players ages 12–18. 300+ College coaches and professional scouts attend this event to see the best talent the US has to offer.
 Columbus Crew, Assistant Coach (MLS) - 2005
 Memphis Futbol Club Youth Director - 2005 - 2009
 Tennessee Rush Technical Director - 2009 - 2011
 Tennessee Olympic Development Program (ODP) Staff Coach - 2007
 Arlington Soccer Academy Executive Director - 2011 to Present
 Fellowship of Christian Athletes (FCA) Soccer National Director and leading the National Soccer Ministry - 2011 - 2015
 Creighton University Women's Soccer Coach - 2014 - Current
 Paule was Awarded The Big East Coaching Staff of the Year- 2020

Personal life
In 1997, Ross married Laurie Paule. He has three children, Jorden, Emma, and Rossi. They currently live in Tennessee, where Ross' wife serves as the Director/Owner of the Arlington Recreation Soccer academy with over 600 players. All three of his children play with the Arlington Soccer Academy.

References

External links
 

1976 births
Living people
American soccer players
Colorado Foxes players
Soccer players from Memphis, Tennessee
Colorado Rapids players
Columbus Crew players
Creighton Bluejays men's soccer players
Major League Soccer players
New York Red Bulls players
Major League Soccer All-Stars
A-League (1995–2004) players
Colorado Rapids draft picks
Sportspeople from Memphis, Tennessee
Leaders of the Fellowship of Christian Athletes
Association football midfielders
Creighton Bluejays women's soccer coaches
American soccer coaches